Upstream stimulatory factor 1 is a protein that in humans is encoded by the USF1 gene.

Function 

This gene encodes a member of the basic helix-loop-helix leucine zipper family and can function as a cellular transcription factor. The encoded protein can activate transcription through pyrimidine-rich initiator (Inr) elements and E-box motifs. This gene has been linked to familial combined hyperlipidemia (FCHL). Two transcript variants encoding distinct isoforms have been identified for this gene.

A study of mice suggested reduced USF1 levels increases metabolism in brown fat.

Interactions 

USF1 (human gene) has been shown to interact with USF2, FOSL1 and GTF2I.

References

Further reading

External links 
 

Transcription factors